The 1994–95 Ohio Bobcats men's basketball team represented Ohio University in the college basketball season of 1994–95. The team was coached by Larry Hunter and played their home games at the Convocation Center. The Bobcats won the 1994 Preseason NIT at Madison Square Garden, downing New Mexico State 84-80 in the championship game, and defeated Ohio State in Columbus in the same tournament.

Roster

Schedule and results

|-
!colspan=9 style=| Regular Season

|-
!colspan=9 style=| MAC Regular Season
|-

|-
!colspan=9 style=| MAC Tournament

|-
!colspan=9 style=| National Invitation Tournament

Statistics

Team Statistics
Final 1993–94 Statistics

Source

Player statistics

Source

Rankings

Awards and honors
Gary Trent – MAC Player of the Year (3x)

Team players drafted into the NBA

References

Final 1995 Division I Men's Basketball Statistics Report
Ohio Record Book

Ohio Bobcats men's basketball seasons
Ohio
Ohio
Bob
Bob